The Kibitzer is a 1930 American pre-Code comedy film directed by Edward Sloman and written by Marion Dix, Sam Mintz and Viola Brothers Shore. It is based on the 1929 play The Kibitzer by Jo Swerling and Edward G. Robinson. The film stars Harry Green, Mary Brian, Neil Hamilton, Albert Gran, David Newell and Guy Oliver. The film was released on January 11, 1930, by Paramount Pictures.

Outline
A gentle comedy about a Jewish character who keeps giving people advice, i.e. kibitzing. His advice creates all kinds of complications, especially after he comes into a large sum of money to dispose of as he pleases. The character is played by Harry Green, who specialised in playing Jewish comedic characters.

Cast
Harry Green as Ike Lazarus
Mary Brian	as Josie Lazarus
Neil Hamilton as Eddie Brown
Albert Gran as James Livingston
David Newell as Bert Livingston
Guy Oliver as McGinty
Tenen Holtz as Meyer
Henry Fink as Kikapoupolos
Lee Kohlmar as Yankel
E. H. Calvert as Westcott
Thomas A. Curran as Briggs 
Eddie Kane as Phillips
Henry A. Barrows as Hanson
Paddy O'Flynn as Reporter
Dick Rush as Mullins
Eugene Pallette as Klaus

References

External links
 

1930 films
1930s English-language films
American comedy films
1930 comedy films
Paramount Pictures films
Films directed by Edward Sloman
American black-and-white films
Films about Jews and Judaism
1930s American films